Nathan Tome is an Anglican bishop.

Tome was the second Bishop of Banks and Torres, serving from 2001 to 2013. He then became the inaugural Bishop of Guadalcanal. During 2016 he was the Acting Primate of Melanesia; he retired effective 20 September 2020.

References

Living people
21st-century Anglican bishops in Oceania
Anglican bishops of Banks and Torres
Anglican bishops of Guadalcanal
Year of birth missing (living people)